This is an incomplete list of Israeli schools teaching courses and/or working according to the Mofet educational program, and their location:

Hakfar Hayarok school - Ramat HaSharon
Zevulun Hammer school - Rehovot
Kfar Silver school - Ashkelon
Branco Weiss school - Beit Shemesh
First school - Beit Shemesh
Osafia middle school - Daliyat Al-Karmel
Koftan Halaby school - Daliyat Al-Karmel
Rodman high school - Kiryat Yam
Rodman middle school - Kiryat Yam
Rabin high school - Kiryat Yam
Rabin middle school - Kiryat Yam
Hadassim school - Netanya
Neve Hadasa school - Hof HaSharon Regional Council
Nofey Golan High School - Golan Regional Council
Meir Shfeya high school - Hof HaCarmel Regional Council
Yirka middle school - Yirka
Yigal Allon ORT school - Yokneam Illit
Mughar Comprehensive A - Maghar
Mughar Comprehensive B - Maghar
Mughar Middle School A - Maghar
Mughar Middle School B - Maghar
Rogozin ORT school - Migdal HaEmek
Rogozin ORT middle school - Migdal HaEmek
Yaarat Haemek middle school - Migdal HaEmek
Sharett high school - Nazareth Illit
Sharett middle school - Nazareth Illit
Yigal Allon ORT school - Nazareth Illit
Yigal Allon ORT middle school - Nazareth Illit
Brosh middle school - Afula
Sakhnin middle school A - Sakhnin
Sakhnin middle school B - Sakhnin
ORT Afridar school - Ashkelon
Gutwirth middle school - Sderot

Sources
content/blogsection/5/6/ List of Mofet schools participating in the Atidim program 

Mofet schools
Mofet
 Mofet